
Year 306 (CCCVI) was a common year starting on Tuesday (link will display the full calendar) of the Julian calendar. At the time, it was known as the Year of the Consulship of Constantius and Valerius (or, less frequently, year 1059 Ab urbe condita). The denomination 306 for this year has been used since the early medieval period, when the Anno Domini calendar era became the prevalent method in Europe for naming years.

Events 
 By place 

 Roman Empire 
 July 25 – Constantius I dies outside Eboracum (modern-day York). Constantine, aged 23 or 24, is declared emperor by his troops. Emperor Galerius grants Constantine the title of Caesar, and elevates Flavius Valerius Severus to emperor of the Western Roman Empire.
 Constantine institutes toleration of the Christians in his territories.
 Constantine establishes his capital in Augusta Treverorum (Trier). He begins a major expansion of the city, strengthening the walls, expanding the palace complex and building the Imperial Baths.
 Building on the efforts of Diocletian, Galerius introduces the poll tax to central and southern Italy and truncates the size of the Praetorian Guard, with plans to disband the Guard altogether.
 October 28 – Maxentius, son of former Western Emperor Maximian, leads a revolt by the Praetorian Guard and members of the Senate in Rome, and is proclaimed Emperor. Southern Italy supports Maxentius, as do Africa, Corsica, Sardinia and Sicily. Maxentius recalls Maximian from retirement, who joins his son in Rome. 
 Winter: Constantine fights with success against the Franks.
 Galerius has the Rotunda of Galerius built in Thessaloniki (Macedonia).

 Asia 
 The War of the Eight Princes ends in China.

 By topic 

 Religion 
 The Synod of Elvira concludes with the issue of various canons, including one declaring that killing through a magic spell is a sin and the work of the devil.
 Metrophanes becomes bishop of Byzantium.
 The Patriarchate of Lisbon is established.
 Christianity is established in Roman Britain. British bishops participate in the councils of Arles (314), Nicaea (325) and Arminum (349).

Births 
 Ephrem the Syrian, Syriac theologian and hymnodist (d. 373)

Deaths 

 February 17 – Theodore of Amasea, Roman soldier and martyr
 March 4 – Adrian and Natalia of Nicomedia, Christian martyrs
 July 25 – Constantius Chlorus, Roman emperor (b. c. 250)
 August 25 – Maginus,  Christian hermit and martyr 
 Demetrius of Thessaloniki, Roman soldier and martyr
 Sima Ying, Chinese prince of the Jin Dynasty (b. 279)
 Sima Yong (or Wenzai), Chinese prince and regent

References